Gawley may refer to:

Gawley (surname), English-language surname
Gawley's Gate, small village in County Antrim, Northern Ireland